Maverick Magazines was a British magazine publishing company during the 1990s.

Overview
Maverick Magazines was founded by Hugh Gollner in 1992. Based in Oxford, Oxfordshire, the company published a handful of computer game and leisure magazines from the early to mid-1990s.

See also
Games-X
Mega Drive Advanced Gaming
PC Player (British magazine)
The One (magazine) - publisher of this magazine in its final year (1995-1996)

External links
The Official PC Player archive
The Official Mega Drive Advanced Gaming archive
Interview with Hugh Gollner

Computer magazine publishing companies
Magazine publishing companies of the United Kingdom
Publishing companies established in 1992